How It's Made is a documentary television series that premiered on January 6, 2001, on the Discovery Channel in Canada and Science in the United States. The program is produced in the Canadian province of Quebec by Productions MAJ, Inc. and Productions MAJ 2. In the United Kingdom, it is broadcast on Discovery Channel, Quest, and DMAX.

Episodes

Season 1 (2001)

Season 2 (2002)

Season 3 (2003)

Season 4 (2005)

Season 5 (2005)

Season 6 (2006)

Season 7 (2006–2007)

Season 8 (2007)

Season 9 (2007–2008)

Season 10 (2008)

Season 11 (2008)

Season 12 (2009)

Season 13 (2009)

Season 14 (2009–2010)

Season 15 (2010)

Season 16 (2010)

Season 17 (2011)

Season 18 (2011)

Season 19 (2012)

Season 20 (2012–2013)

Season 21 (2013)

Season 22 (2013–2014)

Season 23 (2014)

Season 24 (2014–2015)

Season 25 (2015)

Season 26 (2015)

Season 27 (2016)

Season 28 (2016)

Season 29 (2017)

Season 30 (2017)

Season 31 (2018)

Season 32 (2019)

Season and episode's notes 
 The "Historical Capsule" segment in Season 1, episode 9 incorrectly states that Florence Nightingale founded the Elizabeth Arden cosmetics company in 1930. In fact, the company was founded by Florence Nightingale Graham.
 The background music in the "Pipe Organs" segment of Season 2, episode 2 is called "Variations for Organ on 'O Filii et Filiæ', Opus 49, No. 2" by French organist and composer Alexandre Guilmant.
 The "Techno Flash" segment was removed from the third season, and the "Historical Capsule" segment was removed from the fifth season.
 In the U.S. version of the show, the "Condoms" segment in Season 28, episode 1 is replaced with the "Rubber Gloves" one, which is a duplicate of the same segment in Season 21, episode 1.
 The Science Channel in the U.S. lists the seasons differently from the original Canadian version of the show:

Notes

References

External links 
 How It's Made at Discovery Canada
 
 List of How It's Made episodes and air dates

Documentary television series about industry
Lists of non-fiction television series episodes